Toño Mauri (born July 29, 1964) is a Mexican singer and actor. He has performed in a number of telenovelas since 1985. He survived a double lung transplant after contracting COVID-19.

Selected filmography

References

External links
 

1964 births
Mexican male film actors
Living people
Mexican male telenovela actors
Mexican people of Italian descent